The New Mexico Sports Hall of Fame is a sports hall of fame in the U.S. state of New Mexico. The hall's mission statement states its purpose is "To induct into the Hall of Fame those athletes, coaches, teams or any other individuals who have had significant careers, achieving high standards of athletic success and/or made contributions to sports, thereby bestowing fame and honor to the state of New Mexico. It was first founded in 1973 as the Albuquerque Sports Hall of Fame, and honored those from the Albuquerque region until expanding in 2005 to include other areas of the state. In 2014 the hall assumed its current name.

Inducted in the 2016 class were multi-sport athlete and coach Adam Kedge; horse jockey Charmayne James; baseball pitcher Frank Castillo; American football coach Marv Levy; basketball player Danny Granger; baseball coach Jim Johns; and baseball outfielder Cody Ross.

The 2015 class of inductees included college baseball coach Ray Birmingham; Olympic discus thrower Carla Garrett; basketball players Sam Lacey and Luc Longley; high school football coach Eric Roanhaus; high school basketball coach Marv Sanders; sportscaster Henry Tafoya; and high school volleyball coach Flo Valdez.

References

External links
 Official website
 List of inductees

Sports in New Mexico
Halls of fame in New Mexico
State sports halls of fame in the United States
All-sports halls of fame
1973 establishments in New Mexico